Lyndon is a town in Cattaraugus County, New York, United States. The population was 686 at the 2020 census. The town is on the east border of the county and is north of Olean.

History 
The area that would become the town was first settled circa 1806. The town of Lyndon was founded in 1829, formed from the town of Franklinville. The town was briefly called "Elgin" around 1857.

In 1875, the population of Lyndon was 805.

The North Lyndon Schoolhouse is listed on the National Register of Historic Places.

Geography

The eastern town line is the border of Allegany County.

Adjacent towns and areas 
The town of New Hudson in Allegany County is to the east. The north town line is shared by the town of Farmersville, and the south town line is shared with the town of Ischua. The town of Franklinville is west of Lyndon.

Demographics

At the 2000 census, there were 661 people, 250 households and 187 families residing in the town. The population density was 19.9 people per square mile (7.7/km2). There were 639 housing units at an average density of 19.2 per square mile (7.4/km2). The racial makeup of the town was 97.28% White, 0.61% African American, 1.21% Native American, and 0.91% from two or more races. Hispanic or Latino of any race were 0.76% of the population.

There were 250 households, of which 33.2% had children under the age of 18 living with them, 60.0% were married couples living together, 7.2% had a female householder with no husband present, and 25.2% were non-families. 18.0% of all households were made up of individuals, and 7.6% had someone living alone who was 65 years of age or older. The average household size was 2.64 and the average family size was 2.98.

Age distribution was 27.7% under the age of 18, 6.2% from 18 to 24, 30.6% from 25 to 44, 25.3% from 45 to 64, and 10.3% who were 65 years of age or older. The median age was 39 years. For every 100 females, there were 101.5 males. For every 100 females age 18 and over, there were 110.6 males.

The median household income was $34,091, and the median family income was $37,361. Males had a median income of $29,063 versus $22,250 for females. The per capita income for the town was $15,054. About 6.7% of families and 12.6% of the population were below the poverty line, including 14.3% of those under age 18 and none of those age 65 or over.

Notable person
Wilson Thomas Hogue, former bishop of the Free Methodist Church

Communities and locations in Lyndon 
Elgin – A hamlet in the center of the town on County Road 47 (Lyndon Center Road).
Gates Creek – A stream flowing out the west town line.
Oil Creek – A stream by the east town line.
Rawson – A hamlet on the east town line on County Road 7A (Rawson Road).

References

External links
 Town of Lyndon official website
 Early history of Lyndon, NY

Towns in Cattaraugus County, New York